The Tefé River (Teffé River in early accounts) is a tributary of the Amazon River (Solimões section) in Amazonas state in north-western Brazil. 

The Tefé River flows through the Juruá-Purus moist forests ecoregion.
It forms the eastern boundary of the Tefé National Forest, created in 1989.
Immediately before merging into the Amazon, it forms Lake Tefé. The city of Tefé is located on the banks of the lake. The Tefé River is a blackwater river.

See also
List of rivers of Amazonas

References

Brazilian Ministry of Transport

Rivers of Amazonas (Brazilian state)
Tributaries of the Amazon River
Tefé